Visoka is a village in the Kardzhali Municipality, which is in the Kardzhali Province, in southern Bulgaria. As of 1 January 2007, the population of Visoka is 2 people, making it one of the least populated villages in the Kardzhali Municipality.

References

Villages in Kardzhali Province